Doty Island is an island in Winnebago County, Wisconsin. Its northern part is in the city of Menasha and its southern part is in the city of Neenah. Doty Island is surrounded by two branches of the Fox River on the north and south, flowing from Lake Winnebago to the east, and Little Lake Butte des Morts to the west.

History
The Ho-Chunk chief Glory of the Morning lived in a village on Doty Island in the 18th and 19th centuries.

It was given the name Doty Island after James Duane Doty (1799–1865), Governor of the Wisconsin Territory (1841–1844), and a two-term member of Congress (1849–1853). Following his service in the nation's capital, Doty retired to his "Grand Loggery" home on the island near its southern shore, in present-day Doty Park in Neenah.

Notes

External links

Doty Island Development Council official website
Doty Cabin on Doty Island

Landforms of Winnebago County, Wisconsin
River islands of Wisconsin